Savalas is a surname of Greek origin that may refer to:

Ariana Savalas (born 1987), American musician, daughter of Telly
George Savalas (1924–1985), American actor, brother of Telly
Telly Savalas (1922–1994), American actor

See also 
Zavala (disambiguation)

Greek-language surnames
Surnames